Chyasvareh Sheykh Ahmad (also Romanized as Chyāsvareh Sheykh Āḥmad) is a village in Kuhdasht-e Jonubi Rural District, in the Central District of Kuhdasht County, Lorestan Province, Iran. At the 2006 census, its population was 163, in 32 families.

References 

Towns and villages in Kuhdasht County